Live Lounge of 2010 was a competition to find the best Live Lounge cover of 2010. After the success of the Ultimate Live Lounge, BBC Radio 1 ran the competition for a second year but only live lounges of the previous year could enter. The competition had a similar format with listeners voting for their favourite performance to win. The first 2 rounds had 3 entries pitted against each other, whereas the Semi-Final was between 2 entries rather than 3 like the previous year.

References

Live Lounge